One Penny is a 2017 United States low budget drama film directed by Michael DeVita and produced by David A. Melendez. It tells the story of a young boy abandoned after the murder of his mother who is taken in by a homeless man known as the "Professor".

The film was shot on location around the Washington, D.C., and Baltimore areas and premiered at the DC Independent Film Festival in February 2017.

Cast 
 Harrison Samuels - Dylan
 Carson Grant - Professor
 Ben Rezendes - Tristan
 Will Roland - Collin
 Erin O'Brien - Jordan

Critical reception
In her review of One Penny for Film International, Elias Savada considered that: " ...  The 
cast all offer well-crafted performances, particularly Harrison Samuels as Dylan ... Devita and Melendez have shown a great deal of creativity in this freshman study of homeless life in the streets."

References

External links
 

2017 films
2010s English-language films